The Roman Catholic Diocese of Quixadá is a diocese located in the city of Quixadá in the Ecclesiastical province of Fortaleza in Brazil.

History
 March 13, 1971: Established as Diocese of Quixadá from the Metropolitan Archdiocese of Fortaleza

Leadership
 Bishops of Quixadá (Roman rite), in reverse chronological order
 Bishop Angelo Pignoli (2007.01.03 – present)
 Bishop Adélio Giuseppe Tomasin, P.S.D.P. (1988.03.16 – 2007.01.03)
 Bishop Joaquim Rufino do Rêgo (1971.04.21 – 1986.03.25), appointedmBishop of Parnaíba, Piaui

References
 GCatholic.org
 Catholic Hierarchy
 Diocese website (Portuguese) 

Roman Catholic dioceses in Brazil
Christian organizations established in 1971
Quixada, Roman Catholic Diocese of
Roman Catholic dioceses and prelatures established in the 20th century